Kristóf Domonkos (born 17 August 1998) is a Slovak footballer who plays for Ružomberok as a midfielder.

Club career

MFK Ružomberok
Domonkos made his Fortuna Liga debut for Ružomberok against Žilina on 14 February 2022. Ružomberok won the home fixture 5–1. Domonkos was replaced after some 67 minutes by Martin Boďa.

References

External links
 MFK Ružomberok official club profile 
 Futbalnet profile 
 
 

1998 births
Living people
People from Galanta
Sportspeople from the Trnava Region
Hungarians in Slovakia
Slovak footballers
Association football midfielders
FC DAC 1904 Dunajská Streda players
KFC Komárno players
Győri ETO FC players
MFK Ružomberok players
Slovak Super Liga players
2. Liga (Slovakia) players
Nemzeti Bajnokság II players
Expatriate footballers in Hungary
Slovak expatriate sportspeople in Hungary